Chitti Tammudu is a 1962 Telugu drama film directed by K. B. Tilak.

The film is based on the 1838 English novel Oliver Twist by Charles Dickens.

The plot
The story is about the problems faced by children in orphanages, irregularities by the management and the related consequences.

Ramu (Jaggayya) and Subhadra (Devika) love one other. Ramu urgently leaves to Kashmir, and returns home to find that his beloved Subhadra is pregnant, and that her father had died of that insult. She delivers a boy in a mission hospital and dies. The boy is admitted to an orphanage and named Chiranjeevi. Hostel warden Tayaramma (Suryakantam) feeds the orphans with insufficient food and they are starving.

Ramu has an elder sister Seetha (Sandhya) and younger brother Srihari (Kanta Rao). Seetha is wife of a lawyer (Ramana Reddy). Ramu dies of chronic cough and mental agony, leaving the property in charge of his brother-in-law.

Cast

Soundtrack
There are about 7 songs in the film.
 "Adagali Adagali Adigedevaro Telali" (Singers: P. Susheela, S. Janaki and group)
 "Ayyo Rama Ayyo Rama Lamba Rasta" (Singers: Madhavapeddi Satyam and Swarnalatha)
 "Dikkuleni Vaariki Devude Dikku" (Singer: P. Susheela)
 "Maya Bazar Lokam Samiranga" (Singer: P. Susheela)
 "Merupu Merisindoyi Mava" (Singer: P. Susheela)
 "Neevu Nenu Jabili Muvvuramu Unnamuga" (Singers: P. Susheela and Ghantasala; Cast: Devika and Jaggayya)
 "Yesko Naa Raja" (Singers: P. Susheela and Maddali)

References

1960s Telugu-language films
1962 films
Indian black-and-white films
Films based on Oliver Twist
Films scored by Pendyala Nageswara Rao
Films directed by K. B. Tilak